Festivals in North Macedonia include:

By type

Film
Manaki Brothers Film Festival

Music
Balkan Music Square Festival, a music festival
International Children's Music Festival "Asterisks", an international children’s festival 
Ohrid Summer Festival, an annual theater and music festival from July to August 
Skopje Jazz Festival, a jazz festival
MakFest, 
Ohrid Choir Festival, a choir festival
Ohrid Fest,
Skopje Fest,

Folklore and traditional
Balkan Festival of Folk Songs and Dances, annual folklore music and dance festival
Galičnik Wedding Festival, an annual festival held in Galičnik in which a selected couple gets married in the traditional "Galička" style wedding

Children's
Si-Do, a children's festival

Theater
Struga Poetry Evenings, an internationally acclaimed poetry festival
 Days of Comedy, a theater comedy festival in Kumanovo

Sports
Ohrid Swimming Marathon, an international open water swimming competition in Lake Ohrid

See also
List of music festivals

External links

 
Festivals
North Macedonia
North Macedonia